John Bonser may refer to: 
Boof Bonser (John Paul Bonser, born 1981), US baseball pitcher
John Bonser (steamship captain) (1855–1913)
John Winfield Bonser (1847–1914), British barrister and judge